The Christian Association of Nigeria (CAN) is an umbrella organisation containing numerous Christian denominations in Nigeria.

History
The Christian Association of Nigeria was founded in 1976, and originally only contained the Catholic Church and mainline Protestant groups. However, it later expanded to include Pentecostal churches as well.

In 2000, the CAN protested the adoption of Sharia law in northern states. In February 2006, while President of the organisation, Akinola issued a statement in response to Muslim violence against Christians, telling Muslims that they did not have a "monopoly on violence". The following day, Christians rioted in retaliation against Muslims, leading to more than 70 deaths. Akinola later claimed his statements had been misinterpreted in the western media. He even threatened to resign in case the riots should continue.

On 2 May 2004, more than 630 Christians were killed in Yelwa, Nigeria. The dead were pinned white name tags identifying them as members of the CAN. The massacre is known as the Yelwa massacre.

In September 2007, the organisation endorsed a social security plan put forth by Jigawa State Governor Sule Lamido.

Organisation
The organisation is made up of five blocs; they are the Christian Council of Nigeria, the Catholic Secretariat of Nigeria, the Pentecostal Fellowship of Nigeria,  Organisation of African Instituted Churches, and the Evangelical Church Winning All/Fellowship of Churches of Christ in Nigeria.

The CAN has Women and Youth Wings, a National Executive Council consisting of 105 members (which elects the President), and a General Assembly of 304 members (which ratifies the President's election).

Leadership
In 2016, Supo Ayokunle, President (and Chief Executive Officer) of The Nigerian Baptist Convention, was elected as president and Prof. Joseph Otubu, of the Motailatu Church Cherubim and Seraphim Movement, the Vice President.

Ayokunle was re-elected for second term and inaugurated in July 2019 alongside his Vice President Rev Dr. Caleb Ahima.
In July 2022, Daniel Okoh was elected as the present president of the association

References

External links
Christian Association of Nigeria Website
Statement by CAN President-In-Council condemning call to jihad

Christian organizations based in Nigeria
National councils of churches
Christian organizations established in 1976
1976 establishments in Nigeria